The Kingdom of Pyuthan was a petty kingdom in the confederation of 24 states known as Chaubisi Rajya.

References 

Chaubisi Rajya
Pyuthan
Pyuthan
History of Nepal
Pyuthan